Rear Admiral Lewis Ashfield Kimberly (April 22, 1830 – January 28, 1902) was an officer in the United States Navy during the American Civil War and the years following.

Biography

Early life and career
Kimberly was born in Troy, New York, and was appointed a midshipman on 8 December 1846. He served aboard the sloop  in the Africa Squadron in 1847–50, then in the Pacific aboard the frigate  during 1850–52, receiving promotion to passed midshipman on June 8, 1852. Kimberly spent some time stationed at the Boston Navy Yard, and then served aboard the sloop  in the East India Squadron between July 1857 and April 1860, before joining the newly commissioned steam sloop  which sailed for the Mediterranean in October 1860, finally returning to the United States in July 1861 after the outbreak of the Civil War.

Between 1856 and 1860, he kept a notebook of doodles, sketches, and watercolors. Themes included geometric designs, architectural drawings, caricatures, cipher codes, and sketches of his colleagues. In 2008, the USS Constitution Museum acquired it.

Civil War service
In 1861–62 Kimberly served aboard the frigate  in the West Gulf Blockading Squadron, taking part in the Mississippi River operations at Port Hudson, Grand Gulf, and Vicksburg, and receiving promotion to lieutenant commander on July 16, 1862. In 1863–64 he served as the executive officer of the steam sloop , seeing action at the Battle of Mobile Bay, after which he was warmly commended for his gallant and efficient service. After the war, he joined the Military Order of the Loyal Legion of the United States.

Post-war commands
From May 1865 Kimberly served aboard the steam frigate , the flagship of the European Squadron, receiving promotion to commander on July 25, 1866, and returning the United States in September 1867. He commanded the receiving ship at New York in 1867–70, then the screw sloop  on the Asiatic Station in 1870–72, taking part in the Korean expedition in May–July 1871, serving as the commander of the landing forces. He then commanded the monitor  along the east coast in 1873–74.

Kimberly was promoted to captain on October 3, 1874, and commanded the sloop  on the South Atlantic Station in 1875–76, and the screw sloop  in the Pacific in 1877–78. During the early 1880s Kimberly served at the New York Navy Yard, and was the President of the Examining and Retiring Board in 1883–85, gaining promotion to commodore on September 27, 1884. He was appointed Commandant of the Boston Navy Yard in 1885, and attained the rank of rear admiral on January 26, 1887. He was then appointed the Commander-in-Chief of the Pacific Squadron. In March 1889, during the Samoan crisis, his flagship  was struck by a violent cyclone while at harbor at Apia. Guiding his men with the words, "If we go down, let us do so with our flag flying," Kimberly skillfully beached his flagship, losing only one man in the raging storm that wrecked Trenton. Following his return to the United States in January 1890, Kimberly was appointed President of the Board of Inspection and Survey; holding the post until his retirement on April 2, 1892.

Rear Admiral Kimberly died on January 28, 1902, in West Newton, Massachusetts.

Namesakes

References
Notes

Bibliography

External links
 1863 albumen print portrait of Lewis Kimberley, taken by Julius Brill, at the University of Michigan Museum of Art

1838 births
1902 deaths
United States Navy admirals
People from New Jersey
Union Navy officers
People of New Jersey in the American Civil War